Alan McDermott (born 22 January 1982) is an Irish former footballer who played as a defender.

Club career
Born in Dublin, McDermott was signed as a trainee by Manchester United in July 1998, before signing his first professional contract with the club on his 17th birthday. In his first season, he played 18 times for the under-17s team and three times for the under-19s, scoring four goals. In 1999–2000, he played just twice for the under-19s at the start of the season before missing the next six months; he returned for the final two matches of the campaign, scoring in the play-off second round match against Leeds United. He also made his debut for the reserve team in the Manchester Senior Cup match against Oldham Athletic on 5 April. He played twice more for the under-19s and once for the reserves in 2000–01, then six more appearances for the reserves in 2001–02, before being released at the end of the season.

McDermott joined Ayr United in 2002. After a spell on trial at Arbroath, he joined Hamilton Academical in March 2003. He went on to have spells with Shelbourne and Newry, before signing for Kildare County towards the end of 2005.

At the beginning of the 2006 season, he had a brief stint with Dundalk, before re-signing for Kildare County to fill a much needed void in the County defence. He held down a steady place with Kildare due to injuries, firstly to Phil Byrne and then to Ian Malone. He scored his first goal for Kildare in a defeat to Finn Harps in Ballybofey in September 2006.

McDermott proved his versatility during the 2007 season, playing in almost every position except in goal. He added to his goal tally with a dramatic equaliser against Shelbourne at Station Road and one against Kilkenny in the same stadium, but the other end. He was released on 25 August 2007.

International career
McDermott made three appearances for the Republic of Ireland under-17 team at the Lisbon Invitational Tournament in June 2000. He played in games against the United States, Norway and Portugal, and was voted as the player of the tournament. He has also represented Eircom League U21s team.

References

External links
 
 Alan McDermott on playerhistory.com

1982 births
Living people
Association footballers from County Dublin
Republic of Ireland association footballers
Republic of Ireland youth international footballers
Association football defenders
Manchester United F.C. players
League of Ireland players
Dundalk F.C. players
Shelbourne F.C. players
Kildare County F.C. players
Hamilton Academical F.C. players
Scottish Football League players
Newry City F.C. players
NIFL Premiership players